Left Democratic Front is a political alliance in Kerala, India.

Left Democratic Front may also refer to:
Left Democratic Front (Maharashtra)
Republican Left Democratic Front
Left of Catalonia–Democratic Electoral Front
Democratic Left Front